HMS Lancaster is a Duke-class Type 23 frigate of the Royal Navy, launched by Queen Elizabeth II on 24 May 1990. The ship is known as "The Queen's Frigate", the Duke of Lancaster being a subsidiary title of the Sovereign. Being the third ship in the Type 23 class, Lancaster was originally allocated the pennant number F232 until it was noted that the 232 is the Royal Navy report form for groundings and collisions and therefore considered unlucky. She is one of the few ships left in the fleet with some female officers but mess decks which are men-only. It is quite common when she has returned from long operations that she is flown over by the Avro Lancaster bomber which is part of the Battle of Britain Memorial Flight based at RAF Coningsby.

Operational history

1992–2000
In 1994, Lancaster deployed on a nine-month mission to the Caribbean Sea, and the Eastern Pacific Ocean, During this time she acted as guardship for the royal yacht , conducted anti-drug smuggling operations and sonar trials. She also acted as guardship for Queen Elizabeth II during the Commonwealth Games in Victoria, British Columbia, Canada, in August 1994.

2001–2010

Lancaster was involved in anti-drug operations in the Caribbean, but also delivered Vice Admiral Adrian Johns in 2009 to his new post as Governor of Gibraltar. In February 2010 Lancaster was deployed in waters off the Horn of Africa as part of Combined Task Force 150, tackling piracy, drug-running, people trafficking, arms smuggling, and other criminal and terrorist threats.

In September 2010 Lancaster entered refit in Portsmouth.

2011–2017
Lancaster returned to sea in early 2012 and returned to active service in Spring 2013. The £17.9m contract covered upgrades to communications, the Sea Wolf and command systems, the installation of a 30 mm remote-operated gun and a transom flap. Both shafts were replaced, four refurbished diesel generators installed and new paint applied to the hull. The accommodation, galley and dining halls were all refurbished at the same time. Half the crew returned to the ship in October 2011, under the command of Lt Cdr Charlie Guy until Cdr Steve Moorhouse took over in November 2011.

In July to August 2013, she was on a counter-narcotics mission in the Caribbean, seizing a  haul of cocaine with an estimated street value of £100 million after sailors and an embarked U.S. Coast Guard Law Enforcement Detachment boarded a speedboat near Puerto Rico.

On 23 March 2015, Lancaster became the first ship in the Royal Navy to deploy with the navy's new uniform and Wildcat helicopter.

The crew of the Lancaster gathered on the deck of the vessel to spell the word sister, as a present from the Royal Navy, on the birth of Princess Charlotte on 2 May 2015.

Between 12 and 16 October 2015 Lancaster and  participated the bicentennial anniversary commemorations of Napoleon's arrival on Saint Helena after his defeat at the Battle of Waterloo, and subsequent surrender to British forces.

She arrived back in the UK on 17 December 2015.

Upon her return to the UK, Lancaster entered a period of "extended readiness" in Portsmouth awaiting refit in 2017. Lancaster departed Portsmouth on 31 March 2017 under tow for Plymouth.

2018–present 
Lancaster underwent a life extension refit (LIFEX) at HMNB Devonport from 2017 to 2019 which included fitting of the Artisan 3D radar, Sea Ceptor anti-air missiles and strengthening the backbone of the ship.

The ship arrived back to its Home Port, HMNB Portsmouth, in December 2019. The ship was returned to operations in July 2020.

In August 2022, it was reported that in preparation for her planned deployment to the Persian Gulf to replace , Lancaster had been fitted with a full complement of eight Harpoon anti-ship missiles. Lancaster sailed for the Gulf on August 15 on a deployment starting with NATO exercises in the Atlantic and Mediterranean. Once reaching the Persian Gulf, she was expected to remain forward deployed until 2025 with her crew being rotated every four months. Lancaster arrived in the gulf in November 2022 and a crew swap was performed in December.

Affiliations
The Queen
The Duke of Lancaster's Regiment (King's, Lancashire and Border)
The Lancashire Army Cadet Force
City of Lancaster
Duchy of Lancaster
Adjutant General's Corps
Duke of Lancaster's Own Yeomanry
Battle of Britain Memorial Flight
Worshipful Company of Feltmakers
University of Lancaster
Morecambe and Lancaster Sea Cadet Corps (TS Lancaster)
Preston Sea Cadet Corps (TS Galloway)
The Worshipful Company of Constructors

References

External links

 

 

Frigates of the United Kingdom
Ships built on the River Clyde
History of Lancaster
Military history of Lancashire
1990 ships
Type 23 frigates of the Royal Navy